1523 Pieksämäki, provisional designation , is a stony Florian asteroid from the inner regions of the asteroid belt, approximately 9 kilometers in diameter. It was discovered on 18 January 1939, by Finnish astronomer Yrjö Väisälä at the Turku Observatory in Southwest Finland, and named for the town of Pieksämäki.

Orbit and classification 

This S-type asteroid is a member of the Flora family, one of the largest groups of stony asteroids in the main-belt. It orbits the Sun at a distance of 2.0–2.5 AU once every 3 years and 4 months (1,226 days). Its orbit has an eccentricity of 0.09 and an inclination of 5° with respect to the ecliptic.

Physical characteristics

Lightcurves 

In December 2005, American amateur astronomer Donald P. Pray obtained a rotational lightcurve at Carbuncle Hill Observatory in collaboration with other astronomers. Light-curve analysis gave a well-defined rotation period of 5.3202 hours with a brightness variation of 0.47 magnitude.

Previous photometric observations were made by Kryszczyńska et al. in July 2004, that gave an identical period with an amplitude of 0.40 magnitude, and by Claes-Ingvar Lagerkvist, who derived a period of 5.33 hours (Δ0.5 mag) already in the 1970s. In March 2013, another well-defined period of 5.3210 hours (Δ0.42 mag) was obtained by French amateur astronomer René Roy.

Diameter and albedo 

According to the surveys carried out by NASA's Wide-field Infrared Survey Explorer with its subsequent NEOWISE mission, Pieksämäki measures 9.111 and 10.008 kilometers in diameter, and its surface has an albedo between 0.213 and 0.505. The Collaborative Asteroid Lightcurve Link assumes an albedo of 0.24 – derived from 8 Flora, the family's principal body and namesake – and calculates a diameter of 8.98 kilometers based on an absolute magnitude of 12.4.

Naming 

This minor planet was named for Pieksämäki, an eastern Finnish town in Southern Savonia. The official  was published by the Minor Planet Center on 20 February 1976.

References

External links 
 Asteroid Lightcurve Database (LCDB), query form (info )
 Dictionary of Minor Planet Names, Google books
 Asteroids and comets rotation curves, CdR – Observatoire de Genève, Raoul Behrend
 Discovery Circumstances: Numbered Minor Planets (1)-(5000) – Minor Planet Center
 
 

001523
Discoveries by Yrjö Väisälä
Named minor planets
19390118